The Supreme Court of the United States handed down seven per curiam opinions during its 2018 term, which began October 1, 2018, and concluded October 6, 2019.

Because per curiam decisions are issued from the Court as an institution, these opinions all lack the attribution of authorship or joining votes to specific justices. All justices on the Court at the time the decision was handed down are assumed to have participated and concurred unless otherwise noted.

Court membership

Chief Justice: John Roberts

Associate Justices: Clarence Thomas, Ruth Bader Ginsburg, Stephen Breyer, Samuel Alito, Sonia Sotomayor, Elena Kagan, Neil Gorsuch, Brett Kavanaugh (confirmed Oct. 6, 2018)

Escondido v. Emmons

Shoop v. Hill

Moore v. Texas

Yovino v. Rizo

Frank v. Gaos

Box v. Planned Parenthood of Indiana and Kentucky, Inc.

See also 
 List of United States Supreme Court cases, volume 586
 List of United States Supreme Court cases, volume 587

Notes

References

 

United States Supreme Court per curiam opinions
Lists of 2018 term United States Supreme Court opinions
2018 per curiam